Yunna Petrovna Morits (Moritz) (born June 2, 1937), is a Soviet and Russian poet, poetry translator and activist. She was a recipient of the Andrei Sakharov Prize For Writer's Civic Courage.

Biography
She was born in Kiev, USSR (present-day Kyiv, Ukraine) in a Jewish family. Her father Pinchas Moritz, was imprisoned under Stalin, she suffered from tuberculosis in her childhood, and spent years of hardship in the Urals during World War II. In the 1950s, she went to study in Moscow, where she was briefly expelled from college for her poems' critical stance and alienation from the Soviet system. Her poem was a tribute to Titsian Tabidze, a Georgian poet executed by Stalin in 1937. In 1961, she became widely known for her collection about the Far North, The Cape of Desire, based on her journey aboard an Arctic icebreaker, and she was among the few young poets favored by Anna Akhmatova.

Since the 1960s, she also became known for her poetic translations into Russian from many languages (these translations, commissioned by Soviet publishing houses, often employed an intermediary literal translator and a poet). She rendered into Russian verse such poets as Moisei Toif, Constantine Cavafy and Federico García Lorca.

In later years, she attracted many young readers with her children poetry, some of which, like her adult work, became known to mass audience through songs created by guitar singer-songwriters, especially by Sergey Nikitin. Her other published work includes short stories, op-eds and, most recently, graphics.

She has been founding member of several liberal organizations of artistic intelligentia, including the Russian section of International PEN. She is a member of Russian PEN Executive Committee and its Human Rights Commission. She has been awarded several prestigious prizes, including Andrei Sakharov Prize For Writer's Civic Courage.

Politics
After 2014 Morits became a supporter of the Russian occupation of Donbass and Crimea. Some of her recent poetry conveys anti-Ukrainian and anti-Western sentiments, and her invective at perceived anti-Russian campaign by the West.

References

Sources
 Post-War Russian Poetry, Edited by Daniel Weissbort, Penguin Books, London, 1974,

External links

 http://www.arlindo-correia.org/040804.html
 http://www.morits.owl.ru/
 http://morits.ru/

1937 births
Living people
Ukrainian Jews
Soviet Jews
Jewish poets
Poets from Kyiv
Soviet women writers
Soviet writers
Russian women poets
20th-century Russian women writers
20th-century Russian writers
International Writing Program alumni
Children's poets
Maxim Gorky Literature Institute alumni